Rodrigo Pablo Gattas Bertoni (born 2 December 1991) is a Chilean professional footballer who plays as a forward for Segunda División Profesional de Chile club San Antonio Unido.

Club career

Hilal Al-Quds
In summer 2016, Gattas signed with West Bank Premier League side Hilal Al-Quds.
In a recent interview he described his time in Palestine as "Beautiful".

Cerro
On 22 February 2017, Gattas returned to South America, signing with Uruguayan Segunda División side Cerro. He made his debut as a substitute on 7 May in a 2–1 win against Peñarol. Gattas went on to make a total of six appearances for Cerro that season.

Rangers Talca
In January 2018, Gattas returned to Chile, signing with Chilean Primera B side Rangers de Talca. That season, he made fourteen league appearances for Rangers, including twelve starts, and scored four goals. He also made another four appearances in the Copa Chile.

Santa Cruz
In January 2019, Gattas signed with Deportes Santa Cruz. He scored one goal in eight appearances that season before leaving the club in late April to pursue an opportunity in North America.

York9
On 26 April 2019, Gattas signed with Canadian Premier League side York9. He made his debut for York9 the next day, coming on as a substitute in the first ever Canadian Premier League game, a 1–1 draw with Forge FC. Gattas scored his first goal for York9 against Pacific FC on 18 May 2019, netting a penalty in a 2–2 draw. On 27 July 2019, Gattas scored the first hat-trick in Canadian Premier League history in a 6–2 win over HFX Wanderers FC.

Gabala
On 11 February 2020, Gattas signed a 1.5-year contract with Azerbaijan Premier League side Gabala.

Montijo
On 28 November 2020, Gattas signed with Spanish Tercera División side UD Montijo.

San Antonio Unido
In July 2022, he joined San Antonio Unido in the Segunda División Profesional de Chile.

International career
Gattas has previously received call-ups to the Palestinian national team, but has yet to earn a cap. In an interview in September 2019, Gattas indicated that he was no longer inclined to play for Palestine and would refuse any future call-ups.

Career statistics

References

External links
Gattas at Football Lineups
Rodrigo Gattas at Soccerway

1989 births
Living people
Association football forwards
Footballers from Santiago
Chilean footballers
Chile under-20 international footballers
Chilean people of Palestinian descent
Chilean expatriate footballers
Expatriate footballers in the State of Palestine
Expatriate footballers in Uruguay
Chilean expatriate sportspeople in Uruguay
Expatriate soccer players in Canada
Chilean expatriate sportspeople in Canada
Expatriate footballers in Azerbaijan
Chilean expatriate sportspeople in Azerbaijan
Expatriate footballers in Spain
Chilean expatriate sportspeople in Spain
Unión Española footballers
Unión La Calera footballers
Cobreloa footballers
Cobresal footballers
Santiago Morning footballers
Hilal Al-Quds Club players
C.A. Cerro players
Rangers de Talca footballers
Deportes Santa Cruz footballers
York United FC players
Gabala FC players
C.D. Montijo players
C.D. Arturo Fernández Vial footballers
San Antonio Unido footballers
Chilean Primera División players
Segunda División Profesional de Chile players
Primera B de Chile players
West Bank Premier League players
Uruguayan Primera División players
Canadian Premier League players
Azerbaijan Premier League players
Tercera División players
Segunda Federación players